Savaş Yurderi (born 10 February 1975), known by his stage name Kool Savas, is a German rapper. Along with Taktlo$$, he formed the highly influential German rap duo Westberlin Maskulin (1997–2000). He was also a founding member of the German rap crew Masters of Rap in 1996.

In 2012, he collaborated in "Xavas", a duo formation with Xavier Naidoo, a German soul and R&B singer-songwriter and actor in the album Gespaltene Persönlichkeit. The two had already worked together on a number of other releases.

Savas is considered one of the most successful, best and influential German rappers. He is often referred to as the King of German rap. His nickname is King Kool Savas (KKS) and Essah.

Early life 
Born in Aachen to a German mother and a Turkish father, Savas' family moved to Turkey when he was a year old. His father, who is from Çorum, was arrested because of his political posture against the then-military government in Turkey, and, as a result, his mother was forced to return to Aachen with Savas.

Career

Essah Entertainment (2010–present) 
His 2011 album Aura included a single with the same name and a song featuring Xavier Naidoo, titled LMS 2012. In May 2012, Savas announced a collaborative album with Xavier Naidoo titled Gespaltene Persönlichkeit under the alias "Xavas" scheduled for release in Germany on 21 September 2012. The track list was announced in August 2012, containing a total of 15 tracks

His fourth studio album, Märtyrer, was released on 14 November 2014.

Discography 

Studio albums
 2002: Der beste Tag meines Lebens
 2007: Tot oder lebendig
 2011: Aura
 2014: Märtyrer
 2019: KKS
 2021: Aghori

Mixtapes
 2004: Kool Savas goes Hollywood
 2005: Die John Bello Story
 2006: Wer hatz erfunden? (with Optik Schweiz)
 2008: Die John Bello Story II
 2009: Die John Bello Story II – Brainwash Edition (remix version)
 2010: Die John Bello Story III
 2016: Essahdamus

Remix albums
 2004: Die besten Tage sind gezählt

Compilations
 2008: The Best of Kool Savas

Collaboration albums
 1997: Hoes, Flows, Moneytoes (with Westberlin Maskulin)
 2000: Battlekings (with Westberlin Maskulin)
 2001: NLP (with M.O.R.)
 2003: Nur noch 24 Stunden (with Freunde der Sonne)
 2005: One (with Azad)
 2006: Optik Takeover! (with Optik Army)
 2012: Gespaltene Persönlichkeit (with Xavier Naidoo as Xavas)
 2017: Royal Bunker (with Sido)

References

External links 

 Official website
 Official Facebook page
 YouTube

1975 births
Living people
German people of Turkish descent
German rappers
Turkish rappers
People from Aachen
Participants in the Bundesvision Song Contest
Gangsta rappers